Daniel Jeannotte (born 22 September 1981) is a Canadian actor. He gained recognition for his roles as Brandon Russell in the American-Canadian fantasy television series Good Witch, and as James Stuart in the CW period drama series Reign. He also portrayed Arno Dorian through performance capture in Assassin's Creed Unity, an action-adventure video game developed by Ubisoft Montreal and published by Ubisoft. In April 2017, Jeannotte joined the Freeform drama series The Bold Type as Ryan Decker, a writer at Pinstripe magazine, who is Jane Sloan's (Katie Stevens) romantic interest. Since 2022, Jeannotte has also played the recurring role of Sam Kirk in Star Trek: Strange New Worlds.

Filmography

Film

Television

Video games

References

External links
 
 

1981 births
21st-century Canadian male actors
Canadian male film actors
Canadian male television actors
Canadian male video game actors
Canadian male voice actors
Living people
Male actors from Montreal